Nicholas Raymond Suriano (born April 14, 1997) is an American freestyle and folkstyle wrestler who competes at 57 kilograms. In freestyle, he claimed the 2021 Henri Deglane Grand Prix gold medal and the 2021 Matteo Pellicone Ranking Series silver medal. As a folkstyle wrestler, Suriano was the 2022 NCAA Division I National and Big Ten Conference champion at 125 pounds for the Michigan Wolverines, repeating what he had accomplished in 2019 at 133 pounds, and at Rutgers University, where he was a NCAA finalist and the Big Ten Conference champion in 2018.

Wrestling career

High school 
Suriano was born and raised in the state of New Jersey, where he played football as a defensive back in his youth and was introduced to wrestling by his father at age seven. At age 12, he quit the sport of football to focus solely on wrestling. Suriano then attended Bergen Catholic High School and became one of the most accomplished wrestlers in the history of his home state; accumulating eight NJSIAA state titles overall, four individuals and four team championships, being the first New Jersey wrestler to do so. Suriano was undefeated with a record of 159–0 and also picked up runner-up honors to eventual rival Daton Fix at the 2014 US Cadet Nationals in freestyle.

College years 
After his legendary run in high school, Suriano committed to the Pennsylvania State University to wrestle as a Nittany Lion for Cael Sanderson.

2016–2017 
As a freshman, Suriano compiled 16 victories and 3 defeats (two of the losses were by injury default) with notable wins over the season's NCAA champion and finalist Darian Cruz and Ethan Lizak, the season's B1G runner–up Tim Lambert and eventual NCAA DII National runner–up Jose Rodriguez. He was the third seed at the NCAAs, however, he suffered a broken ankle in a dual match against Nick Piccininni and was unable to compete at the Big Ten Conference championships and at the NCAA championships.

2017–2018 
After his injury, Suriano decided to transfer from PSU to Rutgers University for multiple reasons and started wrestling as a Scarlet Knight starting since his sophomore year. He had a highly successful run in his first year in the new college, ending the season with 25 wins and a lone loss and compiling notable victories during regular season over eventual three–time All-American Sebastian Rivera (twice) and eventual two–timers Ronnie Bresser and Zeke Moisey. At the Big Ten Championships, he won his first bout, however, he was forced to medical forfeit his next matches and was eliminated of the tournament. Entering the NCAAs undefeated, he made his way to the finals by defeating four opponents, including the defending champion Darian Cruz and other two seeded wrestlers. At the finals, he faced the heavily accomplished Hawkeye Spencer Lee, whom he ended up losing to, becoming the runner–up of the tournament.

2018–2019 
In his junior season, he moved up a weight class (from 125 to 133 pounds). He ended the year with a 26–3 record and notable victories in regular-season over defending MAC champion John Erneste (eventual two–time MAC champion and All-American) and eventual ACC champion Micky Phillippi. At the Big Ten Conference Championships, he defeated four opponents including future two–time All–Americans Luke Pletcher and Austin DeSanto and future three-timer Ethan Lizak without suffering a loss to become the titleholder at his division. At the NCAA Championships, he made his way to the finals beating three opponents including the heavily accomplished Stevan Mićić and once again Ethan Lizak. In the finals, he faced the also heavily decorated Daton Fix, whom he outscored 4 points to 2 in the second sudden victory period of the bout to become the champion at 133–pounds, the first in the history of Rutgers (his teammate Anthony Ashnault would become the second later in the tournament).

2019–2020 
The newly crowned NCAA champion, Suriano upset '19 Pan American Champion and '18 World Championship medalist Joe Colon at the annual event Beat The Streets, on May 6 in a freestyle match. On September, Suriano announced he had taken an Olympic redshirt for the season in order to pursue freestyle aspirations.

At the prestigious Bill Farrell Memorial in November, Suriano dropped down to 57 kilograms and went on to tech former DI All-American and two-time Big 12 Champion from Oklahoma State Eddie Klimara and Canadian Dragos Robertson in his first two matches, before losing to fellow NCAA champion from Wisconsin Seth Gross. In the consolation bracket, he defeated former four-time DI All-American and '12 graduate from Minnesota Zach Sanders, '16 US University National champion and two-time DI All-American Zane Richards (technical fall), and two-time US Open National runner-up and '16 NCAA champion Nahshon Garrett, to place third.

Suriano then competed at the US Nationals in late December, where he defeated future Pan American champion Shelton Mack and '13 US University National All-American Britain Longmire in the first two matches, before losing in a razor-close match against 2019 Junior World finalist and DI All-American from Cornell Vito Arujau. In the consolation bracket, he once again defeated Zane Richards and added fellow NCAA champion Darian Cruz to the list by technical fall, before forfeiting in the third-place match against Arujau, to place fourth and qualify for the 2020 US Olympic Team Trials.

2021 
Suriano was scheduled to wrestle at the 2020 US Olympic Team Trials on April 4–5. However, the event was postponed along with the 2020 Summer Olympics due to the COVID-19 pandemic. Both competitions were rescheduled to take place in 2021.

After more than a year of inactiveness in any ruleset and social spectrum, Suriano competed at the Henri Deglane Grand Prix of France on January 16, in his first international tournament overseas. In the quarterfinals, he dominantly shut down '19 European Games and '15 Junior World Champion from Azerbaijan Mahir Amiraslanov, with seven unanswered points. Next, he took out '13 Junior World Championship bronze medalist from Georgia Beja Bujiashvili, four points to one to make the finals, where he outmatched Islam Bazarganov from Azerbaijan, seven points to one, to claim the championship.

Suriano then wrestled at the prestigious Matteo Pellicone Ranking Series on March 7. In the first round, he was edged by '18 World Championship runner-up Nurislam Sanayev, as Sanayev received two points off Suriano grabbing fingers and a point off passiveness, against a two-point takedown from Suriano. In his next three matches, he got an injury default from Daulet Temirzhanov and decisions from three–time Junior World Champion Ahmet Peker and '19 Yasar Dogu International champion Givi Davidovi. In the gold-medal match, he got a rematch against Sanayev, whom he once again lost to, claiming the silver medal.

Suriano was then slated to compete at the rescheduled US Olympic Team Trials in April 2–3 as the fifth seed, in an attempt to represent the United States at the 2020 Summer Olympics. However, it was officially announced in the day of the event, that Suriano had been forced to withdraw from the event due to a COVID-19 positive test. Suriano was considered by many as one of the favorites to claim the Olympic spot despite his seed. He was then registered to come back to competition on June 8, at the prestigious Poland Open. However, it was announced hours before his scheduled appearance that Suriano had withdrawn from the event for unknown reasons.

On July 21, it was announced that Suriano had officially finished his career at Rutgers University and entered the transfer portal.

Instead, he registered to come back at the 2021 US World Team Trials from September 11 to 12, intending to represent the country at the World Championships at 61 kilograms. After making the quarterfinals, Suriano was upset by 2015 NCAA champion Nathan Tomasello on points, dropping his chances of a World Team spot. He beat 2021 Pan American Champion Shelton Mack in the consolation bracket, but chose to forfeit his next match the next day.

2022 
On November 28, 2021, it was revealed that Suriano had transferred to the University of Michigan and would compete at 125 pounds for the Michigan Wolverines in his return to college wrestling. Suriano went 8–0 during regular season before claiming his third Big Ten Conference championship. The top-seed, he went straight to the finals despite facing and beating returning NCAA finalist Brandon Courtney and returning All-American Sam Latona. Suriano won his second National title by beating fellow New Jersey native Pat Glory, capping off his college career.

Freestyle record 

! colspan="7"| Senior Freestyle Matches
|-
!  Res.
!  Record
!  Opponent
!  Score
!  Date
!  Event
!  Location
|-
! style=background:white colspan=7 |
|-
|Loss
|
|align=left| Carter Young
|style="font-size:88%"|FF
|style="font-size:88%"|September 12, 2021
|style="font-size:88%" rowspan=4|2021 US World Team Trials
|style="text-align:left;font-size:88%;" rowspan=4| Lincoln, Nebraska
|-
|Win
|17–5
|align=left| Shelton Mack
|style="font-size:88%"|3–1
|style="font-size:88%" rowspan=3|September 11, 2021
|-
|Loss
|16–5
|align=left| Nathan Tomasello
|style="font-size:88%"|0–3
|-
|Win
|16–4
|align=left| Sean Fausz
|style="font-size:88%"|10–2
|-
! style=background:white colspan=7 | 
|-
|Loss
|15–4
|align=left| Nurislam Sanayev
|style="font-size:88%"|2–4
|style="font-size:88%" rowspan=5|March 7, 2021
|style="font-size:88%" rowspan=5|Matteo Pellicone Ranking Series 2021
|style="text-align:left;font-size:88%;" rowspan=5|
 Rome, Italy
|-
|Win 
|15–3
|align=left| Givi Davidovi
|style="font-size:88%"|3–2
|-
|Win 
|14–3
|align=left| Ahmet Peker
|style="font-size:88%"|4–2
|-
|Win 
|
|align=left| Daulet Temirzhanov
|style="font-size:88%"|INJ
|-
|Loss 
|13–3
|align=left| Nurislam Sanayev
|style="font-size:88%"|2–3
|-
! style=background:white colspan=7 | 
|-
|Win
|13–2
|align=left| Islam Bazarganov
|style="font-size:88%"|7–1
|style="font-size:88%" rowspan=3|January 16, 2021
|style="font-size:88%" rowspan=3|Grand Prix de France Henri Deglane 2021
|style="text-align:left;font-size:88%;" rowspan=3|
 Nice, France
|-
|Win
|12–2
|align=left| Beka Bujiashvili
|style="font-size:88%"|4–1
|-
|Win
|11–2
|align=left| Mahir Amiraslanov
|style="font-size:88%"|7–0
|-
! style=background:white colspan=7 | 
|-
|Loss
|
|align=left| Vitali Arujau
|style="font-size:88%"|FF
|style="font-size:88%" rowspan=6|December 21–22, 2019
|style="font-size:88%" rowspan=6|2019 US Nationals - US Olympic Trials Qualifier
|style="text-align:left;font-size:88%;" rowspan=6|
 Fort Worth, Texas
|-
|Win
|10–2
|align=left| Darian Cruz
|style="font-size:88%"|TF 10–0
|-
|Win
|9–2
|align=left| Zane Richards
|style="font-size:88%"|TF 12–0
|-
|Loss
|8–2
|align=left| Vitali Arujau
|style="font-size:88%"|2–2
|-
|Win
|8–1
|align=left| Britain Longmire
|style="font-size:88%"|TF 10–0
|-
|Win
|7–1
|align=left| Shelton Mack
|style="font-size:88%"|4–1
|-
! style=background:white colspan=7 | 
|-
|Win
|6–1
|align=left| Nahshon Garrett
|style="font-size:88%"|8–1
|style="font-size:88%" rowspan=6|November 15–16, 2019
|style="font-size:88%" rowspan=6|2019 Bill Farrell Memorial International Open
|style="text-align:left;font-size:88%;" rowspan=6|
 New York City, New York
|-
|Win
|5–1
|align=left| Zane Richards
|style="font-size:88%"|TF 10–0
|-
|Win
|4–1
|align=left| Zach Sanders
|style="font-size:88%"|6–2
|-
|Loss
|3–1
|align=left| Seth Gross
|style="font-size:88%"|2–4
|-
|Win
|3–0
|align=left| Dragos Robertson
|style="font-size:88%"|TF 10–0
|-
|Win
|2–0
|align=left| Eddie Klimara
|style="font-size:88%"|TF 11–0
|-
|Win
|1–0
|align=left| Joe Colon
|style="font-size:88%"|3–1
|style="font-size:88%"|May 6, 2019
|style="font-size:88%"|2019 Beat The Streets: Grapple at the Garden
|style="text-align:left;font-size:88%;" |
 New York City, New York
|-

NCAA record 

! colspan="8"| NCAA Division I Record
|-
!  Res.
!  Record
!  Opponent
!  Score
!  Date
!  Event
|-
! style=background:white colspan=6 |2022 NCAA Championships  at 125 lbs
|-
|Win
|85–7
|align=left|Pat Glory
|style="font-size:88%"|5-3
|style="font-size:88%"|March 19, 2022
|style="font-size:88%" rowspan=5|2022 NCAA Division I National Championships
|-
|Win
|84–7
|align=left|Brandon Courtney
|style="font-size:88%"|4-1
|style="font-size:88%" rowspan=2|March 18, 2022
|-
|Win
|83–7
|align=left|Sam Latona
|style="font-size:88%"|Fall
|-
|Win
|82–7
|align=left|Anthony Noto
|style="font-size:88%"|8-3
|style="font-size:88%" rowspan=2|March 17, 2022
|-
|Win
|81–7
|align=left|Logan Ashton
|style="font-size:88%"|MD 16-3
|-
! style=background:white colspan=6 |2022 Big Ten Conference  at 125 lbs
|-
|Win
|80–7
|align=left|Eric Barnett
|style="font-size:88%"|MD 12-4
|style="font-size:88%"|March 6, 2022
|style="font-size:88%" rowspan=3|2022 Big Ten Conference Championships
|-
|Win
|79–7
|align=left|Devin Schroeder
|style="font-size:88%"|Fall
|style="font-size:88%" rowspan=2|March 5, 2022
|-
|Win
|78–7
|align=left|Dylan Shawver
|style="font-size:88%"|MD 18-6
|-
|-
|Win
|77–7
|align=left|Tristan Lujan
|style="font-size:88%"|MD 14–3
|style="font-size:88%"|February 13, 2022
|style="font-size:88%"|Michigan State - Michigan Dual
|-
|Win
|77–7
|align=left|Jacob Moran
|style="font-size:88%"|Fall
|style="font-size:88%"|February 11, 2022
|style="font-size:88%"|Michigan - Indiana Dual
|-
|Win
|76–7
|align=left|Patrick McKee
|style="font-size:88%"|MD 14–6
|style="font-size:88%"|January 23, 2022
|style="font-size:88%"|Minnesota - Michigan Dual
|-
|-
|Win
|75–7
|align=left|Dylan Shawver
|style="font-size:88%"|TF 16–1
|style="font-size:88%"|January 28, 2022
|style="font-size:88%"|Rutgers - Michigan Dual
|-
|Win
|74–7
|align=left|Drew Hildebrandt
|style="font-size:88%"|2–1
|style="font-size:88%"|January 21, 2022
|style="font-size:88%"|Penn State - Michigan Dual
|-
|Win
|73–7
|align=left|Malik Heinselman
|style="font-size:88%"|MD 11–3
|style="font-size:88%"|January 14, 2022
|style="font-size:88%"|Michigan - Ohio State Dual
|-
|Win
|72–7
|align=left|Jake Staud
|style="font-size:88%"|TF 19–2
|style="font-size:88%" rowspan=2|January 9, 2022
|style="font-size:88%"|Army Michigan ECM	
|-
|Win
|71–7
|align=left|Gage Curry
|style="font-size:88%"|MD 18–7
|style="font-size:88%"|Michigan - Pittsburgh Dual
|-
! style=background:lighgrey colspan=6 |Start of 2021–2022 Season (senior year)
|-
! style=background:lighgrey colspan=6 |End of 2018–2019 Season (junior year)
|-
! style=background:white colspan=6 |2019 NCAA Championships  at 133 lbs
|-
|Win
|70–7
|align=left|Daton Fix
|style="font-size:88%"|SV 4-2
|style="font-size:88%" rowspan=5|March 21, 2019
|style="font-size:88%" rowspan=5|2019 NCAA Division I National Championships
|-
|Win
|69–7
|align=left|Stevan Mićić
|style="font-size:88%"|4-1
|-
|Win
|68–7
|align=left|Ethan Lizak
|style="font-size:88%"|Fall
|-
|Win
|67–7
|align=left|Korbin Myers
|style="font-size:88%"|7-2
|-
|Win
|66–7
|align=left|Dylan Duncan
|style="font-size:88%"|MD 12-3
|-
! style=background:white colspan=6 |2019 Big Ten Conference  at 133 lbs
|-
|Win
|65–7
|align=left|Luke Pletcher
|style="font-size:88%"|4-1
|style="font-size:88%" rowspan=4|March 9, 2019
|style="font-size:88%" rowspan=4|2019 Big Ten Conference Championships
|-
|Win
|64–7
|align=left|Austin DeSanto 
|style="font-size:88%"|6-3
|-
|Win
|63–7
|align=left|Ethan Lizak
|style="font-size:88%"|9-2
|-
|Win
|62–7
|align=left|Orion Anderson
|style="font-size:88%"|Fall
|-
|Win
|61–7
|align=left|Orion Anderson
|style="font-size:88%"|Fall
|style="font-size:88%"|February 22, 2019
|style="font-size:88%"|Rutgers - Maryland Dual
|-
|Loss
|60–7
|align=left|Stevan Mićić
|style="font-size:88%"|2-3
|style="font-size:88%"|February 17, 2019
|style="font-size:88%"|Michigan - Rutgers Dual
|-
|Win
|60–6
|align=left|Ben Thornton 
|style="font-size:88%"|MD 12-4
|style="font-size:88%"|February 10, 2019
|style="font-size:88%"|Rutgers - Purdue Dual
|-
|Win
|59–6
|align=left|Garret Pepple
|style="font-size:88%"|MD 20-7
|style="font-size:88%"|Feb 8, 2019
|style="font-size:88%"|Rutgers- Indiana Dual
|-
|Win
|58–6
|align=left|Jonathan Gomez
|style="font-size:88%"|TF 25-9
|style="font-size:88%"|Feb 3, 2019
|style="font-size:88%"|Princeton - Rutgers Dual
|-
|Win
|57–6
|align=left|Jevon Parrish
|style="font-size:88%"|MD 12-2
|style="font-size:88%"|Feb 1, 2019
|style="font-size:88%"|Nebraska - Rutgers Dual
|-
|Win
|56–6
|align=left|Logan Griffin
|style="font-size:88%"|TF 22-4
|style="font-size:88%"|January 25, 2019
|style="font-size:88%"|Michigan State - Rutgers Dual
|-
|Loss
|55–6
|align=left|Austin DeSanto 
|style="font-size:88%"|4-6
|style="font-size:88%"|Jan 18, 2019
|style="font-size:88%"|Rutgers - Iowa Dual
|-
|Loss
|55–5
|align=left|Daton Fix
|style="font-size:88%"|TB-2  2-3
|style="font-size:88%"|Jan 13, 2019
|style="font-size:88%"|Oklahoma State - Rutgers Dual
|-
|Win
|55–4
|align=left|Jens Lantz 
|style="font-size:88%"|MD 14-5
|style="font-size:88%"|January 11, 2019
|style="font-size:88%"|Wisconsin - Rutgers Dual
|-
|Win
|54–4
|align=left|Skyler Petry
|style="font-size:88%"|TF 20-5
|style="font-size:88%"|January 6, 2019
|style="font-size:88%"|Rutgers - Minnesota Dual
|-
|Win
|53–4
|align=left|Anthony Cefolo 
|style="font-size:88%"|MD 15-3
|style="font-size:88%"|December 16, 2019
|style="font-size:88%"|Rider - Rutgers Dual
|-
! style=background:white colspan=6 |2018 Cliff Keen Invitational  at 133 lbs
|-
|Win
|52–4
|align=left|Mitch Brown
|style="font-size:88%"|MD 22-8
|style="font-size:88%" rowspan=5|November 30, 2018
|style="font-size:88%" rowspan=5|2018 Cliff Keen Invitational
|-
|Win
|51–4
|align=left|Korbin Myers
|style="font-size:88%"|7-2
|-
|Win
|50–4
|align=left|Micky Phillippi
|style="font-size:88%"|MD 11-3
|-
|Win
|49–4
|align=left|John Erneste 
|style="font-size:88%"|3-2
|-
|Win
|48–4
|align=left|Seth Koleno 
|style="font-size:88%"|TF 21-6
|-
|Win
|47–4
|align=left|Trent Olson
|style="font-size:88%"|Fall
|style="font-size:88%"|November 16, 2018
|style="font-size:88%"|Rutgers - Hofstra Dual
|-
|Win
|46–4
|align=left|Mitch Brown
|style="font-size:88%"|MD 14-2
|style="font-size:88%"|November 10, 2018
|style="font-size:88%"|Utah Valley - Rutgers Dual
|-
|Win
|45–4
|align=left|forfeit
|style="font-size:88%"|MFOR
|style="font-size:88%"|November 10, 2018
|style="font-size:88%"|Rutgers - Appalachian State Dual
|-
|Win
|44–4
|align=left|Christopher Caban
|style="font-size:88%"|Fall
|style="font-size:88%"|November 3, 2018
|style="font-size:88%"|Johnson & Wales (RI) - Rutgers Dual
|-
|Win
|43–4
|align=left|Bobby Demeter
|style="font-size:88%"|Fall
|style="font-size:88%"|November 3, 2018
|style="font-size:88%"|Centenary (NJ) - Rutgers Dual
|-
|Win
|42–4
|align=left|Gary Joint
|style="font-size:88%"|MD 15-4
|style="font-size:88%"|November 3, 2018
|style="font-size:88%"|Fresno State - Rutgers Dual
|-
! style=background:lighgrey colspan=6 |Start of 2018-2019 Season (junior year)
|-
! style=background:lighgrey colspan=6 |End of 2017-2018 Season (sophomore year)
|-
! style=background:white colspan=6 |2018 NCAA Championships  at 125 lbs
|-
|Loss
|41–4
|align=left|Spencer Lee
|style="font-size:88%"|1-5
|style="font-size:88%" rowspan=5|March 15, 2018
|style="font-size:88%" rowspan=5|2018 NCAA Division I National Championships
|-
|Win
|40–3
|align=left|Darian Cruz
|style="font-size:88%"|2-0
|-
|Win
|39–3
|align=left|Louie Hayes
|style="font-size:88%"|MD 8-0
|-
|Win
|38–3
|align=left|Zeke Moisey 
|style="font-size:88%"|Fall
|-
|Win
|37–3
|align=left|JR Wert
|style="font-size:88%"|TF 17-0
|-
|Win
|36–3
|align=left|Sebastian Rivera 
|style="font-size:88%"|4-1
|style="font-size:88%"|Feb 2, 2018
|style="font-size:88%"|Rutgers - Northwestern Dual
|-
|Win
|35–3
|align=left|Devin Schnupp
|style="font-size:88%"|Fall
|style="font-size:88%"|January 28, 2018
|style="font-size:88%"|Penn State - Rutgers Dual
|-
|Win
|34–3
|align=left|Mitchell Maginnis
|style="font-size:88%"|MD 14-4
|style="font-size:88%"|Jan 21, 2018
|style="font-size:88%"|Rutgerd - Nebraska Dual
|-
|Win
|33–3
|align=left|Jacob Martin
|style="font-size:88%"|TF 19-3
|style="font-size:88%"|Jan 19, 2018
|style="font-size:88%"|Hofstra - Rutgers Dual
|-
|Win
|32–3
|align=left|James Szymanski 
|style="font-size:88%"|MD 12-3
|style="font-size:88%"|January 12, 2018
|style="font-size:88%"|North Carolina -Rutgers Dual
|-
|Win
|31–3
|align=left|Brakan Mead
|style="font-size:88%"|TF 24-9
|style="font-size:88%"|January 7, 2018
|style="font-size:88%"|Ohio State - Rutgers Dual
|-
! style=background:white colspan=6 |2017 Midlands Invitational  at 125 lbs
|-
|Win
|30–3
|align=left|Justin Stickley 
|style="font-size:88%"|TF 19-4
|style="font-size:88%" rowspan=5|December 29, 2017
|style="font-size:88%" rowspan=5|2017 Midlands Invitational
|-
|Win
|29–3
|align=left|Sebastian Rivera 
|style="font-size:88%"|7-6
|-
|Win
|28–3
|align=left|Ronnie Bresser 
|style="font-size:88%"|2-1
|-
|Win
|27–3
|align=left|Zeke Moisey 
|style="font-size:88%"|6-0
|-
|Win
|26–3
|align=left|Steve Polakowski 
|style="font-size:88%"|TF 21-5
|-
|Win
|25–3
|align=left|Justin Stickley 
|style="font-size:88%"|Fall
|style="font-size:88%"|December 8, 2017
|style="font-size:88%"|Iowa - Rutgers Dual
|-
|Win
|24–3
|align=left|Josiah Kline
|style="font-size:88%"|MD 19-5
|style="font-size:88%"|December 1, 2017
|style="font-size:88%"|Rutgers - Lock Haven Dual
|-
! style=background:white colspan=6 |2017 Black Knight Invitational  at 125 lbs
|-
|Win
|23–3
|align=left|Alonzo Allen
|style="font-size:88%"|MD 8-0
|style="font-size:88%" rowspan=4|November 19, 2017
|style="font-size:88%" rowspan=4|2017 Black Knight Invitational
|-
|Win
|22–3
|align=left|Steven Bulzomi 
|style="font-size:88%"|TF 22-3
|-
|Win
|21–3
|align=left|Brandon Loperfido 
|style="font-size:88%"|Fall
|-
|Win
|20–3
|align=left|Fabian Gutierrez
|style="font-size:88%"|MD 16-4
|-
|Win
|19–3
|align=left|Louie Hayes
|style="font-size:88%"|8-1
|style="font-size:88%"|November 11, 2017
|style="font-size:88%"|Virginia - Rutgers Dual
|-
|Win
|18–3
|align=left|Christian Moody
|style="font-size:88%"|4-1
|style="font-size:88%"|November 11, 2017
|style="font-size:88%"|Oklahoma - Rutgers Dual
|-
|Win
|17–3
|align=left|Brandon Cray
|style="font-size:88%"|TF 24-7
|style="font-size:88%"|November 4, 2017
|style="font-size:88%"|Maryland - Rutgers Dual
|-
! style=background:lighgrey colspan=6 |Start of 2017–2018 Season (sophomore year)
|-
! style=background:lighgrey colspan=6 |End of 2016–2017 Season (freshman year)
|-
|Loss
|16–3
|align=left|Michael Beck
|style="font-size:88%"|MFOR
|style="font-size:88%"|March 4, 2017
|style="font-size:88%"|Big Ten Championships
|-
|Loss
|16–2
|align=left|Nick Piccininni
|style="font-size:88%"|INJ
|style="font-size:88%"|Feb 19, 2017
|style="font-size:88%"|Penn State- Oklahoma State Dual
|-
|Win
|16–1
|align=left|Michael Beck
|style="font-size:88%"|TF 23-8
|style="font-size:88%"|Feb 12, 2017
|style="font-size:88%"|Maryland - Penn State Dual
|-
|Win
|15–1
|align=left|Travis Piotrowski 
|style="font-size:88%"|MD 17-6
|style="font-size:88%"|Feb 10, 2017
|style="font-size:88%"|Illinois -Penn State Dual
|-
|Win
|14–1
|align=left|Jose Rodriguez 
|style="font-size:88%"|TF 19-4
|style="font-size:88%"|February 3, 2017
|style="font-size:88%"|Penn State - Ohio State Dual
|-
|Win
|13–1
|align=left|Anthony Rubinetti 
|style="font-size:88%"|Fall
|style="font-size:88%"|Jan 29, 2017
|style="font-size:88%"|Penn State - Northwestern Dual
|-
|Win
|12–1
|align=left|Jens Lantz
|style="font-size:88%"|MD 15-4
|style="font-size:88%"|Jan 27, 2017
|style="font-size:88%"|Penn State - Wisconsin Dual
|-
|Loss
|11–1
|align=left|Thomas Gilman
|style="font-size:88%"|2-3
|style="font-size:88%"|January 20, 2017
|style="font-size:88%"|Penn State - Iowa Dual
|-
|Win
|11–0
|align=left|Brandon Paetzell 
|style="font-size:88%"|MD 16-2
|style="font-size:88%"|January 13, 2017
|style="font-size:88%"|Rutgers - Penn State Dual
|-
|Win
|10–0
|align=left|Tim Lambert
|style="font-size:88%"|3-2
|style="font-size:88%"|January 8, 2017
|style="font-size:88%"|Penn State - Nebraska Dual
|-
|Win
|9–0
|align=left|Ethan Lizak 
|style="font-size:88%"|8-6
|style="font-size:88%"|January 6, 2017
|style="font-size:88%"|Penn State - Minnesota Dual
|-
|Win
|8–0
|align=left|Steven Bulzomi 
|style="font-size:88%"|MD 12-2
|style="font-size:88%"|December 12, 2016
|style="font-size:88%"|Binghamton - Penn State Dual
|-
|Win
|7–0
|align=left|Darian Cruz 
|style="font-size:88%"|7-0
|style="font-size:88%"|December 4, 2016
|style="font-size:88%"|Lehigh - Penn State Dual
|-
! style=background:white colspan=6 |2016 Keystone Classic  at 125 lbs
|-
|Win
|6–0
|align=left|Tim Johnson
|style="font-size:88%"|Fall
|style="font-size:88%" rowspan=4|November 20, 2016
|style="font-size:88%" rowspan=4|2016 Keystone Classic
|-
|Win
|5–0
|align=left|Anthony Rubinetti 
|style="font-size:88%"|MD 16-4
|-
|Win
|4–0
|align=left|Noah Gonser
|style="font-size:88%"|MD 12-4
|-
|Win
|3–0
|align=left|Zack Fuentes 
|style="font-size:88%"|4-2
|-
|Win
|2–0
|align=left|Connor Schram
|style="font-size:88%"|3-0
|style="font-size:88%"|November 13, 2016
|style="font-size:88%"|Stanford - Penn State Dual
|-
|Win
|1–0
|align=left|Trey Chalifoux
|style="font-size:88%"|MD 15-4
|style="font-size:88%"|November 11, 2016
|style="font-size:88%"|Penn State - Army Dual
|-
! style=background:lighgrey colspan=6 |Start of 2016-2017 Season (freshman year)

Stats 

!  Season
!  Year
!  School
!  Rank
!  Weight Class
!  Record
!  Win
!  Bonus
|-
|2022
|Senior
|University of Michigan
|#1
|125 (1st)
|16–0
|100.00%
|75.00%
|-
|-
|2019
|Junior
|rowspan=2|Rutgers University
|#3 (1st)
|133
|29–3
|90.63%
|57.89%
|-
|2018
|Sophomore
|#4 (2nd)
|rowspan=2|125
|25–1
|96.15%
|65.38%
|-
|2017
|Freshman
|Penn State University
|#3 (DNQ)
|16–3
|84.21%
|57.89%
|-
|colspan=5 bgcolor="LIGHTGREY"|Career
|bgcolor="LIGHTGREY"|70–7
|bgcolor="LIGHTGREY"|90.91%
|bgcolor="LIGHTGREY"|62.34%

Awards and honors

2022
 NCAA Division I (125 lbs)
 Big Ten Conference (125 lbs)
2019
 Bill Farrell Memorial International (57 kg)
 BTS: Grapple at the Garden Dual (61 kg)
 NCAA Division I (133 lbs)
 Big Ten Conference (133 lbs)
2018
 NCAA Division I (125 lbs)

References

External links
 

Living people
1997 births
Penn State Nittany Lions wrestlers
Rutgers Scarlet Knights wrestlers
American male sport wrestlers
Sportspeople from Bergen County, New Jersey
People from Paramus, New Jersey
Wrestlers from New Jersey